The 2012–13 Qatari League, also known as Qatari Stars League was the 40th edition of top level football championship in Qatar. The season started on 15 September 2012 and took a monthlong break from 21 December to 21 January 2013 due to the 21st Arabian Gulf Cup. Lekhwiya were the defending champions. Al-Sadd won the league for the 13th time in their history, making them the most successful team in the Qatar Stars League.

Teams
Al Ahli were relegated to the second level league after finishing bottom in the 2011–12 Qatar Stars League campaign.

Al-Sailiya were promoted as the 2nd level champions and are back after one season away from the top flight.

Stadia and locations

1 Al Sailiya do not have a stadium of their own so will share with Al Rayyan.

Personnel and kits
Note: Flags indicate national team as has been defined under FIFA eligibility rules. Players may hold more than one non-FIFA nationality.

Managerial changes

League Expansion

At the end of the season it was announced that the 2013–14 season would feature 14 teams. The decision to increase the numbers of teams means Al Sailiya – who finished bottom of the league – will avoid relegation. Meanwhile, Muaither – who lost to Al Arabi in the play-offs – will join as the 14th team.

The Second Division and the reserve league will also merge to create a stronger second tier.

League table

Relegation playoff

Fixtures and results

Top scorers
As of 18 April 2013

References

Football in Qatar
Qatar Stars League
Stars League